The 2006 Rolex 24 at Daytona was a Grand-Am Rolex Sports Car Series 24-hour endurance sports car race held on January 28–29, 2006 at the Daytona International Speedway road course. The race served as the first round of the 2006 Rolex Sports Car Series. The overall winner of the race was the No. 02 Chip Ganassi/Felix Sabates owned Lexus-Riley Mk XI driven by Scott Dixon, Dan Wheldon, and Casey Mears. The GT class was won by No. 36 Porsche 996 GT3 Cup from TPC Racing, driven by Randy Pobst, Spencer Pumpelly, Michael Levitas, and Ian Baas.

Race results
Class winners in bold.

External links
 Official Results
 Car Information and Images

24 Hours of Daytona
2006 in motorsport
2006 in American motorsport
2006 in sports in Florida